In agriculture, monoculture is the practice of growing one crop species in a field at a time. Monoculture is widely used in intensive farming and in organic farming: both a 1,000-hectare cornfield and a 10-ha field of organic kale are monocultures. Monoculture of crops has allowed farmers to increase efficiency in planting, managing, and harvesting, mainly by facilitating the use of machinery in these operations, but monocultures can also increase the risk of diseases or pest outbreaks. Diversity can be added both in time, as with a crop rotation or sequence, or in space, with a polyculture or intercropping (see table below).

Continuous monoculture, or monocropping, where farmers raise the same species year after year, can lead to the quicker buildup and spread of pests and diseases in a susceptible crop.

The term "oligoculture" has been used to describe a crop rotation of just a few crops, as practiced in several regions of the world.

The concept of monoculture can also extend to (for example) discussions of variety in urban landscapes.

Agriculture 
In an agricultural context, the term describes the practice of planting one species in a field. Examples of monoculture include lawns, fields of wheat or corn, or an apple orchard. 

Note that the distinction between monoculture and polyculture is not the same as between monocropping and intercropping. The first two describe diversity in space, as does intercropping. Monocropping and crop rotation describe diversity over time.

Benefits 
In crop monocultures, each plant in a field has the same standardized planting, maintenance, and harvesting requirements resulting in greater yields and lower costs. When a crop is matched to its well-managed environment, a monoculture can produce higher yields than a polyculture. Modern practices such as monoculture planting and the use of synthesized fertilizers have reduced the amount of additional land needed to produce food, called land sparing.

Risks 
Monocultures of perennials, such as African palm oil, sugarcane, tea and pines, can lead to soil and environmental problems such as soil acidification, degradation, and soil-borne diseases, which ultimately have a negative impact on agricultural productivity and sustainability. Diverse rotations of crop monocultures can minimize the risk of disease and pest outbreaks. However, the shorter the rotation (fewer crops included) the higher the risk. There are examples of short, two-year rotations selecting for pests that are adapted to such rotations.
Ultimately the negative impact of monocultures comes down to two things; loss of biodiversity and the use of pesticides. Healthy ecosystems and habitats are home to hundreds of plant, insect, and animal species. When big stretches of land are used for only one species, the entire balance is disturbed. Important environmental services that are normally provided by the many different species are now left undone. Lower levels of biodiversity on agricultural land also mean that certain insects are left with no natural predators, resulting in their population growing out of control. To control pests on their crops, farmers use heavy pesticides. These can further reduce levels of biodiversity but are also a danger to bodies of water due to chemical run-off.

Forestry
In forestry, monoculture refers to the planting of one species of tree. Monoculture plantings provide greater yields and more efficient harvesting than natural stands of trees. Single-species stands of trees are often the natural way trees grow, but the stands show a diversity in tree sizes, with dead trees mixed with mature and young trees. In forestry, monoculture stands that are planted and harvested as a unit provide limited resources for wildlife that depend on dead trees and openings since all the trees are the same size; they are most often harvested by clearcutting, which drastically alters the habitat. The mechanical harvesting of trees can compact soils, which can adversely affect understory growth. single-species planting also causes trees to be more vulnerable when they are infected with a pathogen, attacked by insects, or affected by adverse environmental conditions.

Residential monoculture 
Lawn monoculture in the United States was historically influenced by English gardens and manor-house landscapes, but its inception into the American landscape is fairly recent. Aesthetics drove the evolution of the residential green areas, with turfgrass becoming a popular addition to many American homes. Turfgrass is a nonnative species and requires high levels of maintenance. However, the drive for its widespread use primarily came from social pressures. At the local level, governments and organizations have begun to take monocultural practices into their own hands (think Homeowner Associations). Various issues related to maintenance of private property have occurred, such as maintaining aesthetics and real estate value. Disagreements in residential maintenance of weeds, lawns, etc, have resulted in civil cases or even direct aggression against neighbors.

Like agriculture, the high levels of maintenance required for turfgrass created a growing demand for chemical management, i.e. pesticides, herbicides, insecticides. A 1999 study showed that in a sample of urban streams, at least one type of pesticide was found in 99% of the streams. One major risk associated with pesticides on lawns include exposure of chemicals into the home through the air, clothing, and furniture which can be more detrimental to children than to the average adult.

Genetic monocultures 
While often referring to the production of the same crop species in a field (space), monoculture can also refer to the planting of a single cultivar across a larger regional area, such that there are numerous plants in the area with an identical genetic makeup to each other. When all plants in a region are genetically similar, a disease to which they have no resistance can destroy entire populations of crops.  the wheat leaf rust fungus caused much concern internationally, having already severely affected wheat crops in Uganda and Kenya, and having started to spread in Asia as well. Given the very genetically similar strains of much of the world's wheat crops following the Green Revolution, the impacts of such diseases threaten agricultural production worldwide.

Historic examples of genetic monocultures

Great Famine of Ireland 
In Ireland, exclusive use of one variety of potato, the "lumper", led to the Great Famine of 1845–1849. Lumpers provided inexpensive food to feed the Irish masses. Potatoes were propagated vegetatively with little to no genetic variation. When Phytophthora infestans arrived in Ireland from the Americas in 1845, the lumper had no resistance to the disease, leading to the nearly complete failure of the potato crop across Ireland.

Bananas 
Until the 1950s, the Gros Michel cultivar of banana represented almost all bananas consumed in the United States because of their taste, small seeds, and efficiency to produce. Their small seeds, while more appealing than the large ones in other Asian cultivars, were not suitable for planting. This meant that all new banana plants had to be grown from the cut suckers of another plant. As a result of this asexual form of planting, all bananas grown had identical genetic makeups which gave them no traits for resistance to Fusarium wilt, a fungal disease that spread quickly throughout the Caribbean where they were being grown. By the beginning of the 1960s, growers had to switch to growing the Cavendish banana, a cultivar grown in a similar way. This cultivar is under similar disease stress since all the bananas are clones of each other and could easily succumb as the Gros Michel did.

Cattle 
 
The term is also used where a single breed of farm animal is raised in large-scale concentrated animal feeding operations (CAFOs).

Many of today's livestock production systems rely on just a small number of highly specialized breeds. Focusing heavily on a single trait (output) may come at the expense of other desirable traitssuch as fertility, resistance to disease, vigor, and mothering instincts. In the early 1990s, a few Holstein calves were observed to grow poorly and died in the first 6 months of life. They were all found to be homozygous for a mutation in the gene that caused bovine leukocyte adhesion deficiency. This mutation was found at a high frequency in Holstein populations worldwide. (15% among bulls in the US, 10% in Germany, and 16% in Japan.) Researchers studying the pedigrees of affected and carrier animals tracked the source of the mutation to a single bull that was widely used in livestock production. In 1990 there were approximately 4 million Holstein cattle in the US, making the affected population around 600,000 animals.

Benefits of genetic diversity 
While having little to no variety in the genetics of an agricultural system can have drawbacks, increasing genetic diversity by introducing organisms with varying genes can divert them and make the system more sustainable. For example, by having crops with varying genetic traits for disease and pest resistance, there is a much lower chance of having those pests or diseases spread throughout the area. This is because if one crop becomes infected with a particular strain of disease or species of pest, there is a chance that the other plants around it will have genes that protect them from that strain or species. This can help increase crop productivity while simultaneously lowering pesticide usage and risk of exposure.

Monofunctionality 
Monofunctionality is an analogous concept, however it is entirely possible for a monofunctional land bloc to have its function produced by multiple species and so does not suffer from all the same downsides. When industrialisation first came to agriculture and silviculture, monofunctionality was advocated as the ideal due to the significant initial advantages in economic efficiency. However, in the years since opinion has shifted away. In the years since it has become clear that monofunctionality suffers from some of the same downsides as monoculture, specifically forgoing synergies and failing to fulfill the whole range of human needs.

See also
 Biodiversity
 Cash crop
 Crop diversity
Crop rotation
 Fallow
Genetically modified organism
Great French Wine Blight
 Gros Michel bananas
 Heirloom plant
Intercropping
 Intensive crop farming
 Kil'ayim (prohibition)
 Neglected and underutilized crop
 Permaculture
Polyculture
 Seed bank
 Three Sisters

References

External links

 Monoculture and disease
 Modern Agriculture: Ecological impacts and the possibilities for truly sustainable farming

Agricultural terminology
Intensive farming